Opoj is a village and municipality of Trnava District in the Trnava region of Slovakia.

Etymology
The name comes from the Slovak opojiť: to saturate, to soak (with water). Opoj: literally "a land area that is saturated with water" (wet meadow). 1266 Opoy.

References

External links
http://en.e-obce.sk/obec/opoj/opoj.html
http://www.statistics.sk/mosmis/eng/run.html
Official web page 

Villages and municipalities in Trnava District